Rhododactyla is a genus of moths of the family Erebidae. The genus was described by Warren in 1889.

Species
Rhododactyla elicrina (Felder & Rogenhofer, 1874) Brazil (Amazonas)
Rhododactyla micra Hampson, 1926 Peru
Rhododactyla semirosea (Herrich-Schäffer, [1858])

References

Calpinae